Yu Seung-wan (born 6 February 1992) is a South Korean footballer who plays as forward for Daejeon Citizen in K League Classic.

Career
Yu joined K League Challenge side Daejeon Citizen in January 2016.

References

External links 

1992 births
Living people
Association football forwards
South Korean footballers
Daejeon Hana Citizen FC players
K League 2 players